Prochoreutis myllerana, Miller’s nettle-tap or small metal-mark, is a moth of the family Choreutidae found in Asia and Europe. Miller's nettle-tap was first described by Johan Christian Fabricius in 1794 from a specimen found in Sweden.

Distribution

This species can be found in most of Europe, east into Russia. It is also known from China (Heilongjiang, Xinjiang), Korea and Japan (Hokkaido).

Description
The wingspan of Prochoreutis myllerana can reach 10–14 mm. Forewings are variegated brown, with a dark brown median fascia showing white dusting. These moths are characterized by 2 + 2 white dots on the upper part of the wings, near the edge.

Prochoreutis myllerana is very similar to Prochoreutis sehestediana, but in the latter the white dusting extends more than half way towards the costa of the forewings and the mentioned 2 + 2 white dots are missing. The apex of P. sehestediana is more pointed. Moreover in P. mullerana, the head of a larva is uniformly pale brown, contrary to Prochoreutis sehedestediana.

Biology
Adults are on wing from May to early September. There are probably three generations per year.  The monophagous larvae feed on common skullcap (Scutellaria galericulata) and lesser skullcap (Scutellaria minor). The young larvae mine the lower leaves of their host plant, older larvae live free among spun leaves. There are also records on white dead-nettle (Lamium album) and red dead-nettle (Lamium purpureum), but these need confirmation. Full grown larvae can be found in June, and in July and August. The pupa forms in a dense white, spindle-shaped cocoon (circa 10 mm long), in a folded leaf. Probably these moths hibernate as adults.

References

External links
 Lepiforum.de 
 Naturhistoriska risksmuseet 
 Prochoreutis myllerana - Biodiversity Heritage Library – Bibliography

Prochoreutis
Leaf miners
Moths described in 1794
Moths of Asia
Moths of Europe
Taxa named by Johan Christian Fabricius